Brian Downey (born 31 October 1944 in St. John's, Newfoundland) is a Canadian actor best known for his portrayal of Stanley Tweedle in the science-fiction television series Lexx.

Career

Downey is a character actor who has appeared in various films and guest starring roles on TV, including Up at Ours and a recurring role on Millennium. His first film role was in a 1986 Andy Jones film called The Adventure of Faustus Bidgood, which features the entire cast of CODCO. Downey has enjoyed a long professional relationship with Lexx creator Paul Donovan, dating back at least to 1988, when Donovan cast Downey in the time travel adventure film Norman's Awesome Experience.

Downey also appeared as Cardinal Juan de Mella in Donovan's medieval TV thriller The Conclave.  Downey has worked with Jessica Lange, JoBeth Williams, Sam Rockwell, and directors such as Joe Sargent. He won the only acting award at the 2010 Atlantic Film Festival for his role in Whirligig, directed by Chaz Thorne, with whom he has worked on two previous features. He played the evil gang leader "The Drake", who runs the town in the feature film Hobo with a Shotgun, starring Rutger Hauer and directed by Jason Eisener.

Downey is also a musician and writer. Before being recruited as an actor, he spent many years as a bass player, guitarist, and blues harmonica player. As of 2020, a Canadian talent management firm advertises him as a big band bandleader and drummer, playing swing music. He has been a writer for many stage plays and has led many scriptwriting workshops. His first full-length stage play, Peter's Other War, was produced during the summer of 2009.

Filmography

Film

Television

References

External links 
 

1944 births
Male actors from Newfoundland and Labrador
Canadian male film actors
Canadian male television actors
Living people
People from St. John's, Newfoundland and Labrador